Yohanan Sukenik was a Jewish footballer, who played for Hapoel Tel Aviv and Mandatory Palestine national football team.

Biography 
Sukenik was born in Łódź, then part of the Russian Empire and immigrated to Mandatory Palestine with his family in 1923. A keen footballer, he joined Maccabi Tel Aviv's youth team, Nordia. In 1927 he moved to Hapoel Tel Aviv, with whom he played until retiring in 1940. With the Hapoel Tel Aviv, Sukenik  won 4 championships and 5 cups.

Sukenik was also part of the Mandatory Palestine national football team, playing four matches for the team, two against Egypt in 1934, scoring the consolation goal for Mandatory Palestine in a 1–4 defeat, and two against Greece in 1938, including appearing as a substitute the first match between the teams.

Sukenik retired in 1940, as he felt that playing football was damaging his feet and settled in Ramat Gan, where he worked as a builder. He tried his hand in coaching Hapoel Ramat Gan, but quit the position as he considered his players weren't making the effort to train properly and quit football altogether.

Honours
League Championships (4):
 1933–34, 1934–35, 1937–38, 1940
Cup (5):
1928, 1934, 1937, 1938, 1939

References

1909 births
1986 deaths
20th-century Israeli Jews
Jewish footballers
Mandatory Palestine footballers
Mandatory Palestine international footballers
Hapoel Tel Aviv F.C. players
Hapoel Ramat Gan F.C. managers
Sportspeople from Łódź
Association football midfielders
Israeli football managers
Polish emigrants to Mandatory Palestine